Augustine Lonergan (May 20, 1874October 18, 1947) was a U.S. Senator and Representative from Connecticut. He was a member of the Democratic Party. He served as a senator from 1933 to 1939.

Biography
Lonergan was born in Thompson, Connecticut, to a father from Ireland and a Canadian-born mother of Irish descent. He attended the public schools in Rockville and Bridgeport and graduated from Yale Law School in 1902. He was admitted to the bar in 1901 and practiced law in Hartford, Connecticut. He was a members of the city planning commission and was assistant corporation counsel of Hartford from 1910 to 1912.

After a failed campaign in 1910, Lonergan was elected as a Democrat to the U.S. House of Representatives from Connecticut's 1st congressional district in 1912, serving from March 4, 1913, to March 3, 1915. He was an unsuccessful candidate for reelection in 1914 but was reelected in 1916 and 1918, serving again from March 4, 1917, to March 3, 1921. He 1920, he ran for the U.S. Senate against incumbent Frank B. Brandegee, losing heavily, and ran again in 1928, losing to Republican nominee Frederic C. Walcott. He was again elected to the House in 1930 and served from March 4, 1931, to March 3, 1933. He was elected to the Senate in 1932, narrowly defeating Hiram Bingham III amidst the Democrat landslide that year, and served one term from March 4, 1933, to January 3, 1939. He was defeated for reelection by Republican John A. Danaher in 1938.

Lonergan practiced law in Washington, D.C. until his death on October 18, 1947. He was interred at Mount St. Benedict's Cemetery in Hartford.

References

1874 births
1947 deaths
American people of Irish descent
People from Thompson, Connecticut
Politicians from Hartford, Connecticut
Yale Law School alumni
Connecticut lawyers
Lawyers from Washington, D.C.
Democratic Party members of the United States House of Representatives from Connecticut
Democratic Party United States senators from Connecticut